Gerald Henry Rendall (1851–1945) was an English educator and college administrator, born at Harrow, where his father was assistant master.  He was educated at Harrow and at Trinity College, Cambridge, graduating BA as 4th Classic in 1874.

He was a fellow and assistant tutor at Trinity from 1875 to 1880.  He was principal of University College, Liverpool, and Gladstone Professor of Greek in 1880-97, and then the headmaster of Charterhouse School 1897-1911. From 1891 to 1895 he was also Vice-Chancellor of the Victoria University.

His most important publications were on early Christian authors writing during the Roman empire and on their late pagan opponents such as Julian the Apostate and Marcus Aurelius.

Rendall was also an advocate of the Oxfordian theory of Shakespeare authorship, a view he propounded in a number of publications, including Personal Clues in Shakespeare Poems & Sonnets (1934) and Shakespeare: Handwriting and Spelling (1931). He became a "fervent and prolific convert" to the theory at the age of 80.

Works
 Text and Commentary to Epistle of Barnabas (1877), edited by Cunningham
 The Emperor Julian, Paganism, and Christianity (1879), Hulsean prize essay for 1876
 versions of Marcus Aurelius (1897, 1901)
 Epistles to the Corinthians (1909)
 Charterhouse Sermons (1911)
 John Smith, of Harrow (1912)
 "Shakespeare Sonnets and Edward de Vere" (1930)

References

External links
 

1851 births
1945 deaths
People educated at Harrow School
Alumni of Trinity College, Cambridge
English antiquarians
Academics of the University of Liverpool
People from Harrow, London
Shakespeare authorship theorists
Oxfordian theory of Shakespeare authorship